Carlos Eduardo Camacho Lutman (born August 11, 1994 in Tapachula, Chiapas) is a Mexican professional footballer.

External links

1994 births
Living people
People from Tapachula
Mexican footballers
Club América footballers
Cimarrones de Sonora players
Club Necaxa footballers
Cafetaleros de Chiapas footballers
Liga MX players
Association football midfielders